In enzymology, a diamine transaminase is an enzyme that catalyzes the chemical reaction:
an alpha,omega-diamine + 2-oxoglutarate  an omega-aminoaldehyde + L-glutamate
Thus, the two substrates of this enzyme are alpha,omega-diamine and 2-oxoglutarate, whereas its two products are omega-aminoaldehyde and L-glutamate.

This enzyme belongs to the family of transferases, specifically the transaminases, which transfer nitrogenous groups.  The systematic name of this enzyme class is diamine:2-oxoglutarate aminotransferase. Other names in common use include amine transaminase, amine-ketoacid transaminase, diamine aminotransferase, and diamine-ketoglutaric transaminase.  This enzyme participates in urea cycle and metabolism of amino groups.

References

 

EC 2.6.1
Enzymes of unknown structure